Fernando Costilla (born 1972) is a Spanish television personality and voice actor, known for the voice in Cuatro's program's Takeshi's Castle, WWE Raw and WWE SmackDown, and also the voice in Marca TV's program's WWE Raw and WWE SmackDown with Héctor del Mar.

References

External links
 

Spanish television personalities
Professional wrestling announcers
Living people
1972 births